Lorenc Leskaj (born 2 October 1968) is an Albanian retired footballer who played as a defender for Partizani Tirana.

Club career
Leskaj played for Partizani Tirana in an infamous September 1987 European Cup first leg in Lisbon against Benfica that saw Partizani lose 4–0 and end the game with 7 men as 4 players were sent off and with Leskaj himself getting a yellow card. Partizani were punished by UEFA for the incidents, and they were knocked out of the competition following a walkover victory for Benfica in what would have been the second leg, and they were also banned from Europe for 4 years.

International career
He made his debut for Albania in a September 1990 friendly match against Greece and earned a total of 2 caps, scoring no goals.

His second and final international was a November 1990 European Championship qualification match against France.

Defection
Leskaj, alongside national team members Genc Ibro and Eduard Kaçaçi, disappeared from the national team squad in March 1991 in Geneva on their way to Paris to play a European Championship qualifier against France. At the time, Albania was still ruled by the communists. The players were later reported to have sought asylum in Switzerland.

Honours
Albanian Superliga: 1
 1987

References

External links

1968 births
Living people
Association football defenders
Albanian footballers
Albania international footballers
FK Partizani Tirana players
Kategoria Superiore players
Albanian defectors